Raúl Gutiérrez Sagredo (born 8 January 1976 in Santa Cruz de la Sierra) is a Bolivian retired football midfielder. He currently works in Blooming's youth sector as one of the managers.

Club career
Nicknamed "Pelecho", Gutiérrez began his career at a young age playing for second division club Libertad. In 1995, he transferred to Blooming, where he spent the next nine years of his professional career including two national championships obtained in 1998 and 1999.

In 2005, Gutiérrez was loaned to Cochabamba's club Aurora, but returned to Blooming the following season. During 2007, he played for Destroyers, and despite having a favorable season, he got injured and could not finish the tournament. The next year, while playing at Blooming for the third time in his career, he announced his retirement from the sport because he suffered from a fear of flying, a problem he was not able to overcome and got worse as the years went on.

International career
He was in the Bolivia national team between 1999 and 2003. He capped for Bolivia in 18 international matches.

Club titles

References
Jugador Raúl Gutierrez deja el fútbol por fobia a viajar en avión at eldeber.com.bo

1976 births
Living people
Sportspeople from Santa Cruz de la Sierra
Association football midfielders
Bolivian footballers
Bolivia international footballers
1999 FIFA Confederations Cup players
Club Blooming players
Club Aurora players
Club Destroyers players